Anemonoides sylvestris (syn. Anemone sylvestris), known as snowdrop anemone or snowdrop windflower, is a perennial plant flowering in spring, native to meadows and dry deciduous woodlands of central and western Europe and temperate Asia. It forms spreading patches, sometimes aggressively spreading.

Another name is wood anemone, but this more commonly refers to the European A. nemorosa or the North American A. quinquefolia.

Description
Flowers have five petals with yellow anthers in the center and are fragrant.

Cultivation
Cultivars include Anemonoides sylvestris 'Madonna'.

References

External links

 
 
 

sylvestris
Flora of Europe
Flora of Asia
Plants described in 1753
Taxa named by Carl Linnaeus